ARK Investment Management LLC is an American investment management firm based in St. Petersburg, Florida, that manages several actively managed exchange-traded funds (ETFs). It was founded by Cathie Wood in 2014. At the height of February 2021, the company had $50 billion in assets under management. By May 2022, assets had dropped to $15.9 billion, after a period of poor performance.

History
In 2014, after Cathie Wood's idea for actively managed exchange-traded funds based on disruptive innovation was deemed too risky by AllianceBernstein, where she was chief investment officer of global thematic strategies, she left and founded Ark Invest. The company is named after the Ark of the Covenant. Wood, a devout Christian, was reading the One-Year Bible at the time of founding. It is also a backronym for Active Research Knowledge.

In October 2014, the company launched its first four active funds: the Innovation ETF, the Genomic Revolution ETF, the Next Generation Internet ETF and the Autonomous Technology & Robotics ETF. These were followed by the Fintech Innovation ETF in 2019 and the Space Exploration & Innovation ETF in 2021.

The company also maintains three index funds: the 3D Printing ETF, launched in 2016, the Israel Innovative Technology ETF, launched in 2017, and the Transparency ETF, launched in 2021.

In November 2020, Resolute Investment Managers announced it would exercise its option to acquire a majority stake in the company. However, in December 2020, Cathie Wood repurchased the option, maintaining control of the company, while continuing to use Resolute's distribution services, obtaining financing from Eldridge Industries. Resolute Investment remains a minority shareholder.

In December 2020, the Innovation ETF became the largest actively managed ETF, with $17 billion in assets under management and a 170% return in 2020. On January 11, 2021, the company became one of the top 10 issuers of exchange-traded funds.

In June 2021, the firm filed to create a bitcoin ETF under the ticker ARKB, pending approval of the SEC, which had yet to approve any ETF based on the asset.

In October 2021, the firm moved its office from New York City to St. Petersburg, Florida.

Investment strategy
ARK Invest focuses on investing in disruptive technology. These technologies include artificial intelligence, DNA sequencing, CRISPR gene editing, robotics, electric vehicles, energy storage, fintech, 3D printing and blockchain technology. It has also invested in cryptocurrencies. The company invests in stocks it projects to double in value over a five-year period.

On November 22, 2022, Cathie Wood stated her $1M Bitcoin price by 2030 during an interview on Bloomberg TV. On that date, November 22, 2022, Bitcoin closed at $16,174; so, Bitcoin's price must increase 61 fold over the next 8 years to reach the $1M price target.

From 2014 to 2021, the ARK Innovation ETF averaged an annual 39% return on investment, over three times the return of the S&P 500 during that time. Street.com published on December 9, 2022: "Ark innovation ETF has dropped 63% so far in 2022 and is down 78% from its February 2021 peak. Wood has defended her strategy by noting that she has a five year investment horizon."

As its funds cannot hold cash, the firm also invests in numerous Big Tech stocks it refers to as "cash-like innovation stocks".

ARK publishes current analyses, transactions and portfolios, and also opens its research reviews to the public. In addition to financial analysts, ARK employs scientists and computer scientists, believing they can better assess the impact of disruptive technologies. Most of the company's analysts are millennials without prior Wall Street experience.

Risks
Critics such as James Grant and Jason Zweig warn that investors chasing outsized returns by investing in Ark ETFs may be disappointed, as "hot" funds and thematic ETFs generally can't sustain their performance.  The flagship ARK Innovation ETF was down 24% for the year 2021. The Short Innovation ETF launched in November 2021 as the first ETF in the United States to provide inverse exposure to another ETF, using swap contracts to provide returns on a single-day basis inverse to the ARK Innovation ETF.

Morningstar, Inc. noted concerns over ARK's sizable ownership in several of its smaller holdings.

Funds
ARK Invest manages the following exchange-traded funds: In July 2022, ARK announced that it would shutter its Transparency ETF (CTRU) effective July 31, 2022, after it was notified that Transparency Global would stop calculating the Tranparency Index.

References

Exchange-traded funds
Financial services companies established in 2014
Investment management companies of the United States
American companies established in 2014
2014 establishments in New York City
Companies based in St. Petersburg, Florida